Xenopterella beameri is a species of fly in the family Lauxaniidae.

References

Lauxaniidae
Articles created by Qbugbot
Insects described in 1965
Diptera of North America